Osmar Abel Miguelucci (born November 15, 1941 in Argentina) is an Argentine former footballer who played as a goalkeeper for clubs in Argentina, Chile, Colombia, Peru, United States and Uruguay, as well as the Argentina national team at the 1963 Pan American Games in São Paulo, Brazil.

Career
Born in Necochea, Miguelucci was raised in Mar del Plata and began playing football with San Lorenzo de Mar del Plata. He made his debut in the Argentine Primera División after joining Argentinos Juniors, where he would play from 1961 to 1966.

In 1971, Miguelucci was sent off after a remarkable series of events in a Primera B match between Temperley and his club, Almirante Brown. In the 13th minute, Temperley were awarded a penalty after Miguelucci fouled Horacio Corbalán in the area. Miguelucci saved Corbalán's first penalty attempt but the referee ordered another attempt because the goalkeeper left his line early.  Nicolás Bieledinovich took the second attempt which Miguelucci saved, but he left his line early again and was issued a yellow card.  The referee called for a third attempt, and Miguelucci left his line early yet again, prompting the referee to issue a second yellow and dismiss him from the match.  A field player, Ricardo Tello, took over his goalkeeping duties and saved the fourth penalty attempt.

In 1977, Miguelucci was also involved in a remarkable relegation battle with Platense. The club won the relegation play-off with Lanús, where the match ended 0–0 and Platense won 8–7 on penalties, with Miguelucci saving four.

Miguelucci played for Argentina at the 1963 Pan American Games.

Teams
 San Lorenzo 1959–1960
 Argentinos Juniors 1961–1966
 Cerro 1967
 New York Skyliners 1967
 Colón 1968–1970
 Junior 1970
 Almirante Brown 1971
 San Martín de Tucumán 1972
 Sport Boys 1973
 Deportes Concepción 1973–1974
 Deportivo Cali 1974
 Atlético Bucaramanga 1975
 Quilmes 1976
 Platense 1977

References

External links
 
 Osmar Miguelucci at playmakerstats.com (English version of ceroacero.es)

1941 births
Living people
Argentine footballers
Association football goalkeepers
Argentina international footballers
Argentine Primera División players
Categoría Primera A players
Peruvian Primera División players
San Lorenzo de Almagro footballers
Argentinos Juniors footballers
San Martín de Tucumán footballers
C.A. Cerro players
Club Atlético Colón footballers
Atlético Junior footballers
Sport Boys footballers
Deportes Concepción (Chile) footballers
Atlético Bucaramanga footballers
Deportivo Cali footballers
Quilmes Atlético Club footballers
Club Atlético Platense footballers
Club Almirante Brown footballers
Argentine expatriate footballers
Argentine expatriate sportspeople in Chile
Expatriate footballers in Chile
Argentine expatriate sportspeople in Colombia
Expatriate footballers in Colombia
Argentine expatriate sportspeople in Peru
Expatriate footballers in Peru
Argentine expatriate sportspeople in Uruguay
Expatriate footballers in Uruguay
Pan American Games medalists in football
Pan American Games silver medalists for Argentina
Footballers at the 1963 Pan American Games
Medalists at the 1963 Pan American Games
Sportspeople from Buenos Aires Province